The 1991 Oklahoma State Cowboys football team represented the Oklahoma State University during the 1991 NCAA Division I-A football season. They participated as members of the Big 8 Conference. They played their home games at Lewis Field in Stillwater, Oklahoma. They were coached by head Coach Pat Jones.

Schedule

Personnel

Coaching staff

Roster
QB Kenny Ford
 DB C Jones

After the season

The 1992 NFL Draft was held on April 26–27, 1992. The following Cowboy was selected.

References

Oklahoma State
Oklahoma State Cowboys football seasons
Oklahoma State Cowboys football